Wir ham' noch lange nicht genug (German for "We're not done yet") is the eighth album by the German rock band Böhse Onkelz. It was released in 1991.

Track listing
Wir ham' noch lange nicht genug (We're not done yet)
Eine dieser Nächte (One of these nights)
Das ist mein Leben (This is my life)
Nur die Besten sterben jung (Only the best ones die young)
Ganz egal (It doesn't matter)
Zieh' mit den Wölfen (Go with the wolves)
Zeig' mir den Weg (Show me the way)
Das erste Blut (First blood)
Wieder mal 'nen Tag verschenkt (Another wasted day)
Ach, Sie suchen Streit (Ah, you're looking for trouble)
3'52"
Wir sind immer für Euch da (We are always here for you)
Wir sind nicht allein (We are not alone)
Lt. Stoned

Track notes
Nur die Besten sterben jung
This song was written in memory of Andreas "Trimmi" Trimborn, the band's best friend. He was murdered onat 16 June 1990, after the Onkelz and Trimmi had gone into the "Speak Easy", a tavern in Frankfurt-Sachsenhausen.

Ganz egal
The murderer of Trimmi was not convicted by the court. Stephan Weidner would appeal to his certain one.

Zeig' mir den Weg
"If you know all better, show me the way" A song against the press, who condemn the Onkelz further as a Nazi-band.

3'52"
An instrumental track. The band could not find a name for it and named it after its duration.

References

Böhse Onkelz albums
1991 albums
German-language albums